Jul is a Christmas album by Carola Søgaard, released in 1991.

Track listing
"Jul, jul, strålande jul" – 2:40
"Juletid" ("Mistletoe and Wine", duet with Christer Sjögren) – 3:50
"Betlehems stjärna" ("Gläns över sjö och strand") – 2:59
"O helga natt" ("Cantique de noël") – 4:04
"Stilla natt" ("Stille Nacht, heilige Nacht") – 3:20
"O Come, All Ye Faithful" ("Adeste Fideles") – 4:02
"I vår vackra vita vintervärld / Jingeling Tingeling" ("Winter Wonderland" / "Sleigh Ride") – 2:43
"Jag drömmer om en jul hemma" ("White Christmas") – 3:22
"Nu tändas tusen juleljus" – 2:41
"När det lider mot jul" ("Det strålar en stjärna") – 3:25
"Vem är barnet" – 3:38
"När juldagsmorgon glimmar" – 2:18
"God jul önskar vi er alla" ("We Wish You a Merry Christmas") – 1:52

Personnel
Peter Ljung – keyboard
Lasse Wellander – guitar
Hasse Rosén – guitar
Kjell Öhman – accordion
Sam Bengtsson – bass

Charts

References

1991 Christmas albums
Carola Häggkvist albums
Christmas albums by Swedish artists
Swedish-language albums